The Dornbirner Ach (also called Dornbirner Ache) is a stream in Vorarlberg, Austria, with its source in the mountains near the alpine village  (belongs to Dornbirn).

Rivers of Vorarlberg
Tributaries of Lake Constance
Rivers of Austria